Llyn Cwm Bychan is a lake in north Wales, and is one of the sources of the River Artro which flows south westwards through Llanbedr and onwards to the sea.
It is located in the Rhinogydd mountains of Snowdonia.

Llanbedr
Llanfair, Gwynedd
Cwm Bychan
Cwm Bychan
Tourism in Gwynedd
Tourism in Snowdonia